Sand and Water is the fourth studio album by American singer-songwriter Beth Nielsen Chapman. It was released in 1997 via Reprise Records. The title track was the only single released, peaking at number 22 on Hot Adult Contemporary Tracks and number 2 on Bubbling Under Hot 100. Included on the album is "Happy Girl", which was later released as a single by Martina McBride in 1998.

Critical reception

Thom Owens of AllMusic gives Sand and Water 4 out of a possible 5 stars and writes, "Although the arrangements on Sand and Water are slicker than anything on Beth Nielsen Chapman's previous albums, boasting everything from country to pop influences, her songwriting remains incisive, melodic and altogether striking, resulting in another stunningly accomplished record."

Track listing

Personnel
 Beth Nielsen Chapman – vocals, keyboards, acoustic guitar, electric slide dulcimer, slide whistle
 Matt Rollings – piano
 Barry Walsh – piano
 Kevin Savigar – piano
 Steve Nathan – keyboards
 Mike Utley – Hammond organ
 Tim Lauer – accordion
 Annie Roboff – bandoneon
 Steuart Smith – electric guitar, gut string electric & acoustic guitars
 Pat Buchanan – electric guitar
 Larry Chaney – electric guitar
 Dominic Miller – gut string guitars
 Bonnie Raitt – dobro, electric slide guitar, guest vocalist
 Michael McDonald – guest vocalist (Seven Shades of Blue)
 Sam Bush – mandolin
 Jonathan Yudkin – mandolin
 Dave Pomeroy – bass
 Michael Rhodes – bass
 Tommy Simms – bass
 Mike Haynes – trumpet
 Tom McAnich – French horn
 Jelly Roll Johnson – harmonica
 Bobby Taylor – oboe
 Jim Keltner – drums
 Brian Barnett – drums, hand drums
 Paul Leim – drums, percussion
 Kim Fleming - background vocals
 Kirby Shelstad – hand drums, percussion, drum program
 Bill Lloyd – background vocals
 Jim Ed Norman – executive producer

Track information and credits verified from Discogs, AllMusic, and the album's liner notes.

Charts

Album

Singles

References

1997 albums
Beth Nielsen Chapman albums
Reprise Records albums
Albums produced by Rodney Crowell